Robert Kabushenga, is a Ugandan lawyer and corporate executive who was the managing director and chief executive officer of the New Vision Group, from January 2007 until January 2021. He currently serves as a non-executive board member of KCB Bank Uganda Limited, a commercial bank, since November 2021.

Background and education
Kabushenga was born in Uganda circa 1971. He was raised by a single mother in Kampala, Uganda's capital city, in the 1970s and 1980s.

He holds a Bachelor of Laws degree awarded by Makerere University, Uganda's oldest and largest public university. He also holds a Postgraduate Diploma in Legal Practice, awarded by the Law Development Centre, in Kampala. In addition, he attended the American Academy of International Law, in Dallas, Texas, United States.

Career
Kabushenga served as the Executive Director of the Uganda Media Centre, and concurrently served as the spokesperson of the government of Uganda. He then served as Board Secretary, Company Secretary and Legal Officer for the New Vision Group from 2002 until 2005. He also worked as Legal and Administration Officer of the Monitor Publications Limited. He became the CEO at Vision Group in January 2007. He replaced William Pike, an expatriate. In January 2021, he resigned his position at the New Vison Group, to pursue other interests.

He was replaced as CEO at the media conglomerate, by Don Wanyama, previously the Senior Presidential Press Secretary. The Uganda government is a major shareholder in the media house, whose shares of stock are listed on the Uganda Securities Exchange.

Other considerations
Kabushenga is an advocate of the High Court of Uganda. He is also a member of the Uganda Law Society. He is a Fellow of the Africa Leadership Initiative and a member of the Aspen Global Leadership Network. In November 2021 he was appointed to the board of KCB Bank Uganda Limited.

See also
 Barbara Kaija
 Patrick Ayota

References

External links
 How New Vision power struggle triggered Kabushenga sacking As of 10 February 2021.

1971 births
Living people
21st-century Ugandan lawyers
Ugandan businesspeople
Ugandan business executives
Ugandan chief executives
Makerere University alumni
Law Development Centre alumni
People from Kanungu District